John McVeigh (born 25 January 1957) is a Scottish former football player and manager.

Playing career
McVeigh started his career with Airdrieonians in 1975, before moving to Australia to play for Brisbane City. He stayed in Australia for a year, before moving back to Scotland to play for Clyde, where he spent four years, captaining the side on several occasions. He had spells at Hamilton Academical, Kilmarnock and Falkirk, before retiring from the game and becoming a coach at Falkirk.

Managerial career
McVeigh's first managerial job came with Partick Thistle in 1997, although it ended in relegation to the Scottish Second Division. McVeigh moved to Dunfermline Athletic as assistant manager before becoming manager of Raith Rovers in June 1999, although he was sacked within six months amidst accusations of bullying younger players. Later receiving £5,000 after a court rule in his favour, McVeigh joined Albion Rovers, spending two years at Cliftonhill before joining Stenhousemuir in 2002. Signing a number of players from Albion, McVeigh resigned from Stenhousemuir.

In June 2009, McVeigh returned to management with Junior club Lanark United. Two months later, McVeigh was involved in an incident in which it was alleged that he hit a referee with a notebook, resulting in a four-year ban. McVeigh resigned from his post shortly after the incident.

Personal life

During his short time at Raith Rovers, McVeigh was one of several footballers to appear in the film A Shot at Glory, featuring Hollywood actors Michael Keaton and Robert Duvall. The film also featured Ally McCoist in a lead role, alongside several members of the Rovers squad.

Honours

Manager
Raith Rovers
Fife Cup : 1999–00

Albion Rovers
Lanarkshire Cup : 2001–02

References

External links

Living people
1957 births
Footballers from Coatbridge
Scottish footballers
Airdrieonians F.C. (1878) players
Clyde F.C. players
Hamilton Academical F.C. players
Kilmarnock F.C. players
Falkirk F.C. players
Partick Thistle F.C. managers
Raith Rovers F.C. managers
Albion Rovers F.C. managers
Stenhousemuir F.C. managers
Brisbane City FC players
Scottish Football League players
Scottish Football League managers
Scottish expatriate footballers
Expatriate soccer players in Australia
Association football midfielders
Scottish football managers
Scottish expatriate sportspeople in Australia